WJMP (1070 kHz) is an AM radio station broadcasting a classic hip hop format. Licensed to Plattsburgh, New York, United States, the station serves the Champlain Valley, including Burlington, Vermont. The station is owned by Loud Media. WJMP's programming is also heard on translator station W279DE (103.7 FM) in Plattsburgh.

History
The station went on the air on June 15, 1968, as WKDR. It became WNWX on June 1, 1993. On April 14, 1995, the station changed its call sign to WZBZ; on January 23, 1998, to WDOT; on July 15, 1999, to WGLY; on February 23, 2001, to WLFE; on April 23, 2002, to WTWK and on January 15, 2017, to WPLB.

A & J Radio (a subsidiary of Loud Media) acquired WTWK from Radio Broadcasting Services (a subsidiary of Northeast Broadcasting) for $140,000 on October 24, 2016. At the time of the sale, the station was running a business news format supplied by Bloomberg Radio. In January 2017, after briefly simulcasting WZXP (a country music station operated by Loud Media but owned by Radioactive, LLC), the station introduced an oldies and classic country format, which was transferred from former sister stations WCAT and WRSA.

On June 13, 2020, WPLB dropped its oldies format for a classic hip hop format using Loud Media's JUMP brand. The station is branded as JUMP 103.7. The WJMP call letters were moved here from 1120 AM in Maryville, Tennessee on October 1, 2021.

Translator

References

External links

JMP (AM)
Radio stations established in 1968
1968 establishments in New York (state)
JMP
Classic hip hop radio stations in the United States